Colonel Bob is a summit in the Colonel Bob Wilderness, on the Olympic Peninsula in Washington state. It is one of the highest points in Grays Harbor County, the highest being named Gibson Peak.

A Henry Fisher map from 1890 depicts Colonel Bob Mountain as McCallas Peak.  Colonel Bob Mountain was first climbed in 1893 by Clark Pealer, J. N., and Robert Locke who named the peak for orator Robert G. Ingersoll.  The climbing party left a cairn and record which was discovered in 1930.

See also 
 Colonel Bob Wilderness

References

External links
 
 
 
 

Mountains of Grays Harbor County, Washington
Mountains of Washington (state)
Olympic Mountains